Ndindi Nyoro, CBS, MP (born 12 December 1985) is a Kenyan politician, an economist and an entrepreneur, and currently the Member of Parliament (MP) for Kiharu Constituency serving a second term. Ndindi belongs to United Democratic Alliance (UDA), a political party under the Kenya Kwanza alliance led by the current and fifth president of Kenya, Dr William Ruto. He is a graduate of Kenyatta University with a Bachelor of Arts (Economics) and was a student leader at the same university. Ndindi occupies a markedly controversial position in Kenya's political life, having risen to prominence with his disdain for the Orange Democratic Movement (ODM) Party leader Raila Odinga, and later an unequivocal supporter for William Ruto's 2022 presidential bid despite rebuff and arduous political battle from Uhuru Kenyatta, Kenyan fourth president, who was determined to thwart Ruto's ascension to presidency. Ndindi has been rated as among the best performing Members of Parliament in Kenya, and he is currently the Chairman of Budget and Appropriations Committee in the National Assembly. During Kenya's 59th Jamhuri Day, Ndindi was feted by President William Ruto with an honour of Chief of Burning Spear (CBS) for his exemplary development record in Kiharu constituency. 

Besides being a Member of Parliament (MP), Ndindi is an entrepreneur with interests in stock brokerage, communication, construction, civil works, water engineering and drilling. His firms include Afrisec Telecoms, and with total capital of $3 million and annual turnover of $500,000. Ndindi is a self-made multi-millionaire, having commenced his entrepreneurship as a cobbler and a hawker in his peasantry teenage life in Murang'a countryside, before elevating to the pinnacle of business success, with Investax Capital being the largest stock broking agency in Kenya. Currently, Ndindi is the largest individual shareholder at Kenya Power and Lighting Company, a public company, with shares totalling 27,291,400, making him third behind Kenyan government and Standard Chartered bank.

Ndindi threw his hat into the ring for the Kiharu Constituency Parliamentary Seat in 2017 and got elected as a Member of Parliament (MP) after scooping 60,881 votes against his closest competitor who garnered 35,181 votes. Ndindi made history as a son of peasant farmer being elected as an MP in a constituency that was famous for the prominent politicians it produced, including Kenneth Matiba. During 2022 general election, Ndindi was re-elected and won the same seat with a landslide where he garnered 68,256 votes against his closest competitor who garnered 9,425 votes.

Ndindi is a confidante and a key member of President William Ruto's inner circle. He was a strong frontrunner to be President William Ruto's running mate in the 9 August General election, but the position went to Rigathi Gachagua who is now Kenya's Deputy President. Ndindi belongs to United Democratic Alliance, a political party under Kenya Kwanza Alliance that trounced Azimio La Umoja Presidential candidate Raila Odinga during the 2022 General election despite the latter receiving the backing and support of the immediate former president Uhuru Kenyatta.

In March 2019, Ndindi proposed a bill in parliament, Anti-corruption and Economics Crime Amendment Bill 2019, which stipulated stringent penalties including execution for those convicted of corruption in Kenya. Though the bill drew a flurry of excitement, ODM Party Leader Raila Odinga slammed it as a ploy to clip powers of the Directorate of Criminal Investigations and Directorate of Public Prosecutions in handling corruption cases. However, Ndindi denied this and blamed the media for misinformation.

On Sunday, 8 September 2019, Ndindi clashed with then Nominated MP Maina Kamanda at a fundraiser ceremony in Kiharu and thereafter sought and arrested by police on allegations of assault, incitement and causing disturbance. His supporters in Murang'a town immediately staged protests and held vigils in demand of his release, maintaining that Ndindi was innocent. Members of Parliament allied to then Deputy President William Ruto termed Ndindi's arrest as mere political persecution and blamed it on then President Uhuru Kenyatta's government operatives for applying bullying tactics to silence those who did not subscribe to their political beliefs. However, Ndindi was freed following morning and charges against him dropped unconditionally.

Ndindi is married to Sophia Wambui. He is the author of a motivational book, 'How to Succeed in High School.

Early life and education 
Ndindi was born in December 1985 in Gathukeini location, Murang'a county. His mother was a peasant farmer while his father a small time carpenter in Kiandutu slums in Thika. Ndindi is the last born son in a family of four, the other siblings being his sisters. Ndindi enrolled for his primary education at Gathukeini Primary School and when he was in Standard 6, he opened a kiosk at his village to juggle between it and the school, but Ndindi's father dealt it a big blow when he purchased all the stock and ordered Ndindi to demolish it and focus on his studies. Upon completing his primary education, Ndindi won a slot at Kiaguthu Boys Secondary School, but he could not join the school due to prohibitively high fees. The family thus enrolled him at Kiambugi Boys Secondary because the school principal was a family friend and could allow for a flexible fee payment plan. Ndindi repaired shoes for his schoolmates at Kiambugi to scrape a living and to add to fee payment. During school holidays, Ndindi burned charcoal and sold second hand clothes to supplement his family's meagre farming income. Ndindi was partly orphaned as his father passed on. Ndindi completed his secondary education in 2003 and performed exemplary well in Kenya Certificate of Secondary Education examinations and was the only student in Kiambugi in his year who won a university placement. But Ndindi had to remain in school and work as a librarian in order to offset fee arrears of $300.

In 2005, Ndindi joined Kenyatta University for a Bachelor of Arts (Economics). To muddle through harsh financial life, Ndindi set a restaurant near the university, but the business performed dismally and he closed it down. He then secured a part-time job as a stockbroker in Nairobi. While a sophomore, Ndindi was elected as a student leader in Kenyatta University Student Association where he was the Academic Secretary. Ndindi graduated from Kenyatta University in December 2009.

Business career 
Ndindi started Stockbridge Securities while a sophomore at Kenyatta University as he was working part-time for Ngenye Kariuki & Company Stockbrokers. Through apprenticeship by his mentor and the director of the company, Ngenye Kariuki who coincidentally happened to be Kiharu's former member of parliament, Ndindi was introduced to the world of stock brokerage. But his start-up lost many business opportunities due to poor internet connection, and after carrying out research in Thika where one of his offices was located, Ndindi discovered the internet problem was widespread. In 2010, he then started Afrisec Telecoms as an internet service provider. Today, the firm has tens of employees and its worth more than $1.2 million. In 2016, Ndindi co-founded a stock brokerage firm, Investax Capital, and due to conflict of interests, he resigned from Stockbridge Securities and receded his shareholding. Investax Capital is the largest stockbroker agency in Kenya with several branches. Later in 2016, Ndindi started yet another firm, to deal with construction, civil works, water engineering and drilling. In September 2022, Ndindi tripled his shares at Kenya Power and Lighting Company at 27,291,400, making him the largest individual shareholder in the public company.

Political career

Early political career 
Ndindi's political career began in Kenyatta University when he was elected as a student leader in 2006 to represent over 40,000 students in the University Senate. He served the same student union with his friend John Kaguchia, the current Mukurweini Member of Parliament and former Speaker of Nyeri County Assembly, and Maryann Njambi Mugo who unsuccessfully vied for Molo Parliamentary seat on KANU ticket in 2017. Through student politics in Kenyatta University, Ndindi met his friend Senator Mwaura Isaac Maigua, a former nominated senator, and other comrades such as Muchangi Karemba and Kuria Kimani who are Members of Parliament for Runjenjes and Molo respectively.

In 2013, Ndindi was appointed the Chairperson of Kiharu Constituency Development Fund (CDF), a position he served until midway in order to offer a chance to someone else.

Election as Kiharu Constituency MP 
In 2017, Ndindi threw his hat into ring for Kiharu Parliamentary Seat where he trounced eleven competitors to clinch Jubilee Party ticket in the party primaries and thereafter won as the Member of Parliament during the 8 August election by scooping 60,991 votes against his main competitor who garnered 35,181 votes. Ndindi's win at only 32 years as a son of peasant farmer was hailed as a remarkable triumph over the big giants such as Kenneth Matiba, Gikonyo Kiano, Kembi Gitura and Ngenye Kariuki that represented the constituency in the past. In 2022 general election, Ndindi was re-elected as member of parliament and won by landslide when he garnered 68,256 votes against his closest competitor who got 9,425 votes.

Controversial Anti-corruption and Economics Crime Amendment Bill, 2019 
In March 2019, Ndindi proposed a bill in parliament to have those convicted of corruption in Kenya face stringent punishment, including execution. The bill, Anti-corruption and Economics Crime Amendment Bill 2019, which was mooted against the backdrop of unsuccessful sentence of serious economic crime offenders in Kenya, also sought to have corruption cases handled exclusively by the Ethics and Anti-Corruption Commission. Though Ndindi's proposals had received general support in and out of National Assembly, Orange Democratic Movement (ODM) party leader Raila Odinga came guns blazing and attributed Ndindi's amendments as a ploy to disempower Directorate of Criminal Investigations and Directorate of Public Prosecutions from handling corruption cases.

8 September 2019 fundraiser clash and subsequent arrest 
On Sunday, 8 September 2019, Ndindi clashed with former Nominated Member of Parliament (MP) Maina Kamanda over protocol in a fundraising ceremony in Gitui Catholic Church in Kiharu when Ndindi insisted on his prerogative to officiate the event as the area MP. An altercation ensued in and outside the church, and the police attempted to arrest Ndindi, but angry supporters shielded him away. Later in the evening, Ndindi found himself marooned inside the studios of Royal Media Services where he had attended a show on Inooro TV as contingent of police officers lay in waiting outside. But he left the media house incognito and surfaced the following morning in Kiangage Primary School in Kiharu on a developmental tour, where he castigated the then Interior Principal Secretary (PS) Karanja Kibicho for misusing police to fight him politically. After playing cat and mouse game with the police, a contingent of paramilitary General Service Unit (GSU) officers were deployed and finally arrested Ndindi at ACK St James Cathedral in Murang'a where he was attending an evening show on Kameme TV alongside two other legislators from Murang'a county.  Ndindi was apprehended and detained in Murang'a Police Station on allegations of assaulting police officers, causing disturbance at the church service and resisting arrest during the fundraiser. News of his arrest provoked a storm of protest in Murang'a, and residents poured on the streets at night and lit bonfires, demanding immediate release of the MP. Ndindi was later released from the police custody later in the night and the following morning he appeared in Murang'a Law Court where charges against him were dropped unconditionally. His supporters went wild with jubilation as Ndindi vacated the court accompanied by a swarm of political leaders. When addressing a multitude of his supporters in Murang'a, Ndindi echoed words of the former Kiharu MP and multi-party democracy activist Kenneth Matiba of 'let the people decide', in reference to the political stance he has taken of supporting Deputy President William Ruto for 2022 presidency, a stand he says, has caused his political persecution. He said this to the media, "I'm elected by the people and it is to them I owe allegiance. We must be given space to exercise our free will, and people should not be bulldozed to follow certain political direction. These persecutors must never lie to themselves that they can buy off souls and hearts of poor people with their money. This money in the first place belong to the poor peasants and their families. I am ready to pay the price for what my people and I believe in."

Team Tangatanga 
Ndindi distinguished himself as a stalwart supporter and an adherent of then Kenyan Deputy President Dr William Ruto, and a figurehead behind Team Tangatanga – a large faction of Members of Parliament (MPs) that supported William Ruto's 2022 presidential bid. Team Tangatanga (which derived its name from President Uhuru Kenyatta's 'kutangatanga' remark – which means to wander – as he referred to William Ruto's frequent political tours to Uhuru Kenyatta's Mount Kenya backyard) was composed a group of dissenters opposed to Uhuru-Raila Handshake (2018 Peace Agreement between President Uhuru Kenyatta and opposition leader Raila Odinga) due to its aim of blocking William Ruto's presidential bid.  Tangataga had its match in a loose political conglomeration called Team Kieleweke (which means clear or known) that comprised some Members of Parliament drawn from Jubilee Party and a few 2017 general election losers who were opposed to William Ruto's 2022 presidential bid. Ndindi and other Tangatanga allied MPs from Mount Kenya region bore the brunt of their association with William Ruto. In July 2019, Ndindi wrote on his Facebook page that there were plans to harass and silence MPs affiliated to Deputy President William Ruto and that he himself had been informed reliably of his imminent arrest. Ndindi said he would not be intimidated since he has 'lived in houses and situations worse than police cells'.

Running Mate Position and William Ruto's Inner Circle 
Ndindi is a confidante and a key member of President William Ruto's inner circle and whose admiration for him, he says, is due to Ruto's humble beginnings. "Like Dr Ruto, my father was nobody. He was a poor carpenter and a hustler who only left us with a hammer, a handsaw and nails as inheritance," Ndindi said this to a news reporter in April 2019. In February, 2019, Ruto described Ndindi as 'among the most progressive and development-oriented legislators' in Kenya.

During and after the formation of Kenya Kwanza alliance under William Ruto, Ndindi had been viewed as a possible running mate to William Ruto, but the position was given to Rigathi Gachagua who is now the Deputy President. Ndindi played a pivotal role in William Ruto's presidential campaign and election as an aggressive mobiliser of his largest ethnic Kikuyu voting block as well as that of youthful Kenyan constituency. Ndindi is now regarded as part of new power brokers at State House after William Ruto's ascension as Kenya's fifth president.

Motivational book: How to Succeed in High School 
Ndindi is a publisher of a motivational book, 'How to Succeed in High School which is popular among the secondary school students. He has donated thousands of it to several schools in Kiharu constituency and beyond.

Personal life 
Ndindi is married to Sophia Wambui. He always concludes his Facebook posts with a declarative 'We are African and Africa is our business.'

References 

Living people
1985 births
21st-century Kenyan politicians
Kenyatta University alumni
People from Murang'a County
Members of the 12th Parliament of Kenya
Members of the 13th Parliament of Kenya